Poshter Boyz is a 2014 Indian Marathi-language comedy film directed by Sameer Patil and written by Sameer Patil and Charudatta Bhagwat. The movie stars Dilip Prabhavalkar, Hrishikesh Joshi, Aniket Vishvasrao in lead roles and Pooja Sawant, Neha Joshi in female lead cast. The film was produced by Shreyas Talpade. This is the second movie produced by Shreyas Talpade under his home production Affluence Movies Private Limited after Sanai Choughade. The film is released in theatres on 1 August 2014. The film is going be remade in Telugu as 'Poshter Boyz' director will be Gopi Ganesh and presented by Akshay Kumar and Rana Daggubati.
The film was remade in Hindi as Poster Boys starring Sunny Deol, Bobby Deol and Shreyas Talpade.

Cast
 Dilip Prabhavalkar as Jagan Deshmukh (Appa)
 Hrishikesh Joshi as Sadanand Kulkarni (Master)
 Aniket Vishwasrao as Arjun
 Pooja Sawant as Kalpana
 Neha Joshi as wife of Sadanand Kulkarni
 Shreyas Talpade as Chief Minister
 Bharat Ganeshpure as District Health Officer
 Murali Sharma as Health Minister of Maharashtra
 Ashwini Kalsekar as Head of Health Department

Soundtrack

The film's soundtrack was composed by Lesle Lewis. Lyrics were penned by Shreyas Talpade, Chaitnya Sant & Ambrish Deshpande.

Track list

Release
The movie was a surprise hit at the box office grossing  in first 3-days. The positive word of mouth helped movie to gross  in its full run making it a blockbuster.

References

External links
 
 
 

2014 films
Films scored by Lesle Lewis
Indian comedy films
Marathi films remade in other languages
2014 comedy films
2010s Marathi-language films